Since the 2003 invasion of Iraq, bombings have killed thousands of people, mostly civilians. Suicide bombings have been used as a tactic in other armed struggles, but their frequency and lethality in Iraq is unprecedented. During the invasion, the United States and United Kingdom dropped 29,199 bombs. The article does not list these, but concentrates on the smaller number of insurgent bombings during the post-invasion phase of the Iraqi conflict (2003–present). 

The main perpetrators of insurgent bombings have been Salafi jihadist organisations such as Al-Qaeda in Iraq, Jamaat Ansar al-Sunna, and the Islamic State. Their main targets were Shia civilians, and to a lesser extent, Multi-National Force – Iraq forces.

Perpetrators
A 2005 Human Rights Watch report analysed the insurgency in Iraq and highlighted, "The groups that are most responsible for the abuse, namely al-Qaeda in Iraq and its allies, Ansar al-Sunna and the Islamic State of Iraq, have all targeted civilians for abductions and executions. The first two groups have repeatedly boasted about massive car bombs and suicide bombs in mosques, markets, bus stations and other civilian areas. Such acts are war crimes and in some cases may constitute crimes against humanity, which are defined as serious crimes committed as part of a widespread or systematic attack against a civilian population."

Analysis
A 2008 RAND Research brief on  counterinsurgency in Iraq: 2003 - 2006 depicts a chart that shows in June and July 2004, Iraqi insurgents began to shift their focus away from attacking U.S. and coalition forces with roadside bombs and instead began targeting the Iraqi population with suicide bombers and vehicle-borne IEDs. By increasing the number of suicide bombings against civilians and accepting their targeting in retribution, the insurgents sought to expose the weakness of the coalition-Iraqi security and reconstruction apparatus, threaten those who collaborated with the government, generate funds and propaganda, and increasingly enact sectarian revenge. The U.S. failure to adapt to this shift had dramatic consequences. By June 2004, U.S. deaths represented less than 10% of overall deaths on the battlefield and Iraqi deaths represented more than 90% - a figure that remained constant for the next 18 months of the War.

An analysis by Iraq Body Count and co-authors published in 2011 concluded that at least 12,284 civilians were killed in at least 1,003 suicide bombings in Iraq between 2003 and 2010. The study reveals that suicide bombings kill 60 times as many civilians as soldiers

Bombings
This article lists all major bombings of the Second Iraq War. For bombings that occurred following the withdrawal of US troops see List of bombings during the Iraqi Insurgency (2011-present)

2003

2003 Jordanian embassy bombing in Baghdad
Canal Hotel bombing
Imam Ali mosque bombing
27 October 2003 Baghdad bombings
2003 Nasiriyah bombing
2003 Karbala bombings

2004

2004 Erbil bombings
2004 Ashura bombings in Iraq
21 April 2004 Basra bombings
2004 Mosul bombings
14 September 2004 Baghdad bombing
30 September 2004 Baghdad bombing
2004 Karbala and Najaf bombings
2004 Baqubah bombing
2004 Kufa shelling
2004 Forward Operating Base Marez bombing

2005

2005 Al Hillah bombing
2005 Musayyib bombing
17 August 2005 Baghdad bombings
14 September 2005 Baghdad bombings
2005 Khanaqin bombings
2005 Aladhamiya bombings

2006

5 January 2006 Iraq bombings
2006 al-Askari mosque bombing
7 April Buratha mosque bombing
1 July 2006 Sadr City bombing
23 November 2006 Sadr City bombings

2007

Mustansiriya University bombings
22 January 2007 Baghdad bombings
3 February 2007 Baghdad market bombing
12 February 2007 Baghdad bombings
18 February 2007 Baghdad bombings
2007 Al Hillah bombings
2007 Tal Afar bombings and massacre
29 March 2007 Baghdad bombings
2007 Iraqi Parliament bombing
2007 Karbala bombings
18 April 2007 Baghdad bombings
2007 Makhmour bombing
2007 al-Askari mosque bombing
2007 Amirli bombing
2007 Kirkuk bombings
26 July 2007 Baghdad market bombing
1 August 2007 Baghdad bombings
2007 Yazidi communities bombings
2007 Al Amarah bombings

2008

1 February 2008 Baghdad bombings
2008 Balad bombing
6 March 2008 Baghdad bombing
2008 Karbala bombing
17 June 2008 Baghdad bombing
2008 Baquba bombings
2008 Dujail bombing
Abdullah restaurant bombing

2009

2009 Baghdad police recruitment centre bombing
2009 Baghdad bombings
23 April 2009 Iraqi suicide attacks
2009 Taza bombing
June 2009 Baghdad bombing
2009 Kirkuk bombing
2009 Tal Afar bombing
August 2009 Baghdad bombings
October 2009 Baghdad bombings
December 2009 Baghdad bombings

2010

25 January 2010 Baghdad bombings
1 February 2010 Baghdad bombing
2010 Baqubah bombings
April 2010 Baghdad bombings
10 May 2010 Iraq attacks
July 2010 Baghdad attacks
17 August 2010 Baghdad bombings
25 August 2010 Iraq bombings
19 September 2010 Baghdad bombings
2010 Baghdad church massacre
2 November 2010 Baghdad bombings

2011

 January 2011 Baghdad shootings
 January 2011 Iraq suicide attacks
 24 January 2011 Iraq bombings
 27 January 2011 Baghdad bombing
 2011 Tikrit assault 
 2011 Al Hillah bombing
 2011 Samarra bombing
 2011 Al Diwaniyah bombing
 2011 Taji bombings
 15 August 2011 Iraq attacks
 28 August 2011 Baghdad bombing
 2011 Karbala bombing
 October 2011 Baghdad bombings
 2011 Basra bombings

See also
Terrorist incidents in Iraq in 2016
Terrorist incidents in Iraq in 2015
Terrorist incidents in Iraq in 2014
Terrorist incidents in Iraq in 2013
Terrorist incidents in Iraq in 2012

References

External links
List of some attacks 2003-2005
Baghdad: Mapping the violence (BBC)
Project Iraq Body Count

bombings

Bombings